Gol Tappeh is a village in Agahan Rural District, Kolyai District, Sonqor County, Kermanshah Province, Iran. At the 2006 census, its population was 38, in 12 families.

References 

Populated places in Sonqor County